Zhuangyuanzhou is a subdistrict and the seat of Beita District in Shaoyang prefecture-level City, Hunan, China. It had 5 villages and 14 communities under its jurisdiction in 2015, its seat is Xindu Community.

References

Beita District
Subdistricts of Hunan